Després, Desprès, Despres, des Prés, Des Pres are French surnames. People with the names include:
 Bernadette Després (born 1941), a French illustrator and comic book artist
 Cyril Despres (born 1974), a French rally driver
 Emile Despres (1909–1973), a U.S. Department of State advisor on German Economic Affairs
 Fernand Desprès (1879–1949), a French shoemaker, anarchist, journalist and Communist activist
 Gregory Despres, a Canadian murderer
 Isabelle Despres (born 1973), a French slalom canoeist
 Jean Despres (1903–1988), a perfume industry businessman
 Jean IV. des Prés (died 1349), a Bishop of Tournai in France
 Josquin Després (died 1521), a French composer
 Julien Desprès (born 1983), a French rowerJean-Baptiste-Denis Despré
 Leon Despres (1908–2009), an American author, attorney and politician
 Loraine Despres, a novelist and screenwriter
 Louise Anne Marie Després (1874–1906), a French croquet player
 Michel Després (born 1957), Canadian former politician in Quebec
 Pierre Desprès (1288–1361), a French cardinal
 Robert Després (1924–2016), a French Canadian businessman
 Rémi Després (born 1943), a French engineer and entrepreneur 
 Sebastien Des Pres (born 1998), an American soccer player
 Serge Despres (born 1978), a Canadian bobsledder
 Simon Després (born 1991),  a Canadian ice hockey player
 Suzanne Desprès (1875–1951), a French actress
 Terrence Des Pres (1939–1987), an American writer and Holocaust scholar

See also
 Desprez, similar surname
 Jean-Baptiste-Denis Despré  (1752–1832),  a French playwright, librettist, journalist, and translato
 Joseph-François Couillard-Després (1765–1828), a farmer and political figure in Lower Canada
 

French-language surnames